Lyndon Lee Hartnick (born 8 July 1986 in Heidelberg) is a South African rugby union player, who most recently played with the . His regular position is flanker or number eight.

Career
He represented the  team in the 2007 Under-19 Provincial Championship competition. Four more starts and one substitute appearance followed that season.

SWD Eagles
He rejoined former team  prior to the 2010 Currie Cup First Division and made his debut for them in the compulsory friendly against . He instantly became a first choice player for them, making twelve appearances in the First Division and promotion/relegation games and continued to frequently represent them in 2011 and 2012.

References

South African rugby union players
Living people
1986 births
Border Bulldogs players
SWD Eagles players
Rugby union flankers
Rugby union players from the Western Cape